There's Something About a Soldier is a 1934 Fleischer Studios animated short film directed by Dave Fleischer and starring Betty Boop.

Plot
Betty is recruiting soldiers for a war against mosquitos. She offers a kiss to anyone who enrolls, which grabs the interest of several men. When Fearless Fred joins, he is stripped to his underwear, revealing his true fat, which is eventually pressed into muscle weight and looks like a real soldier. The war on the mosquitos parodies World War I-style combat. When the townspeople win, they all celebrate, and Betty and Fred kiss.

References

External links
 There's Something About a Soldier at the Big Cartoon Database.
 There's Something About a Soldier on YouTube.
 

1934 films
Animated films about insects
Betty Boop cartoons
1930s American animated films
American black-and-white films
1934 animated films
Paramount Pictures short films
Fleischer Studios short films
Short films directed by Dave Fleischer